Erotylus is a genus of Pleasing Fungus Beetles in the family Erotylidae.

Species
Erotylus cassidoides
Erotylus dichromostigma
Erotylus giganteus
Erotylus helopioides
Erotylus histrio
Erotylus incomparabilis
Erotylus jaspideus
Erotylus leopardus
Erotylus maculiventris
Erotylus nicaraguae
Erotylus nigrotibialis
Erotylus olivieri 
Erotylus permutatus 
Erotylus peruvianus 
Erotylus pustulatus
Erotylus sexfasciatus
Erotylus spectrum
Erotylus subreticulatus
Erotylus taeniatus
Erotylus varians
Erotylus variegatus
Erotylus vinculatus

References

Erotylidae
Cucujoidea genera